The Silesian offensive was a Russian offensive in 1914, during the First World War. 

It lasted from November 11 till December 6, and consisted of the Battle of Łowicz and Battle of Łódź. 

While it marked the furthest Russian forces would ever get to the West during the war, it was a tactical Russian victory – but their strategic defeat.

References
 Spencer Tucker, Priscilla Mary Roberts, World War I: Encyclopedia, ABC-CLIO, 2005, Google Print, p.379
 James L. Stokesbury, A Short History of World War I, HarperCollins, 1981, Google Print, p.72

Conflicts in 1914
Battles of the Eastern Front (World War I)
Battles of World War I involving Germany
Battles of World War I involving Russia
1914 in the Russian Empire